The Hôtel de Toulouse, former Hôtel de La Vrillière is located at 1 rue de La Vrillière, in the 1st arrondissement of Paris. It was built between 1635 and 1640 by François Mansart, for Louis Phélypeaux, seigneur de La Vrillière.

Originally, the mansion had a large garden with a formal parterre to the southwest.

History

In 1712, Louis Alexandre de Bourbon, Count of Toulouse (son of Louis XIV and Madame de Montespan) acquired the Hôtel de La Vrillière and commissioned Robert de Cotte, Premier Architecte du Roi, to redesign it and bring important transformations to its interior.

After the death of Toulouse in 1737, the Hôtel became the Parisian residence of his son, Louis Jean Marie de Bourbon, Duke of Penthièvre, and the birthplace of the latter's daughter, Louise Marie Adélaïde de Bourbon. The princesse de Lamballe, who was the Duke of Penthièvre's widowed daughter-in-law, also resided there until the French Revolution.

Confiscated as a bien national ("national property") during the French Revolution, the Hôtel de Toulouse became the Imprimerie de la République in 1795.  An imperial decree signed by Napoleon I on 6 March 1808, authorised the sale of the Hôtel de Toulouse to the Banque de France, which made it its official seat in 1811.

Filming location
The Hôtel de Toulouse was the site of a scene from Sofia Coppola's Marie Antoinette with its famous Galerie dorée (one of Robert de Cotte's masterpieces) as a room in a palace of her youth. Other films, both French, shot at the site are Vatel and Tous les matins du monde.

Gallery of residents

References

Toulouse
Buildings and structures in the 1st arrondissement of Paris
Buildings and structures completed in 1640
1640 establishments in France